Back 2 Love may refer to:

Music
 Back 2 Love (Rahat Fateh Ali Khan album), 2014
 "Back 2 Love" (Sammie song), 2006
 "Back 2 Love" (Kelly Price song), 2014
 "Back 2 Love" (Dave Audé and JVMIE song), 2017

See also
 Back to Love (disambiguation)